The City Gone Wild (1927) is a silent gangster film produced by Famous Players-Lasky and distributed by Paramount Pictures. The film starred Louise Brooks and was directed by James Cruze, and is now a lost film.

The last known copy of this film was nearly saved in the late 1960s by preservationist David Shepard for deposit at AFI. Paramount had also contracted with junk men to haul off their old rusting reels with the film still wound on. Shepard arrived at the studio just as junkmen carted the film off for disposal.

Cast
Thomas Meighan - John Phelan
Marietta Millner - Nada Winthrop
Louise Brooks - Snuggles Joy
Fred Kohler - Gunner Gallagher
Duke Martin - Lefty Schroeder
Nancy Phillips - Lefty's girl
Wyndham Standing - Frank Ames
Charles Hill Mailes - Luther Winthrop
King Zany - the bondsman
Gunboat Smith - the policeman

References

External links

1927 films
American silent feature films
Films directed by James Cruze
Lost American films
Films based on short fiction
American gangster films
Famous Players-Lasky films
Films with screenplays by Herman J. Mankiewicz
Films with screenplays by Jules Furthman
American crime drama films
American black-and-white films
1927 crime drama films
1927 lost films
1920s American films
Silent American drama films